Reddyanus corbeti is a species of scorpion in the family Buthidae.

References 

Animals described in 1983
corbeti